One Two Three is a 2008 Indian Hindi-language comedy film that is a copy of the 1992 American film Blame It on the Bellboy about three men with similar surnames staying in the same hotel.The movie stars Sunil Shetty, Paresh Rawal, Tushar Kapoor,  Esha Deol, Sameera Reddy,  Neetu Chandra, Upen Patel and Tanisha. It revolves around three men who share the same name — Laxmi Narayan.

Synopsis
Laxmi 1 (Tushar Kapoor) lives a poor man's lifestyle in Mumbai with his widowed mother Kanta, who wants him to be a gangster and would like him to kill people, make money, then marry Chota Khujli's daughter, Meena Khujli. To fulfill his mother's wish, he accepts a contract to kill D'Mello Yadav (Mukesh Tiwari), a Pondi-based gangster who has stolen a diamond.

Laxmi 2 (Sunil Shetty), is the detailed and obedient Secretary of D.M. Pipat. He wants him to buy a vintage car from a Pondi-based used car dealer, Laila (Sameera Reddy).

Laxmi 3 (Paresh Rawal) sells undergarments and runs a business, "Bulbul Lingerie," with his son, Sonu; he travels to Pondi to meet with his new supplier, Jiya (Esha Deol).

The trio book hotel rooms next to each other in Blue Diamond Hotel. Their respective lives are hilariously turned upside down when their names cause all three to end up in the wrong places. They are also hiding from Inspector Mayawati Chautala (Neetu Chandra), who also has a crush on Laxmi 2.

Cast
Suniel Shetty as Laxmi Narayan 2 
Tushar Kapoor as Laxmi Narayan 1
Paresh Rawal as Laxmi Narayan 3
Esha Deol as Jiya, Laxmi Narayan 1's love interest.
Sameera Reddy as Laila, car dealer.
Neetu Chandra as Inspector Mayawati Chautala
Murali Sharma as Murli Manohar Munde
Upen Patel as Chandu
Tanisha as Chandni
Mukesh Tiwari as D'Mello's Yadav "Papa"
Sanjai Mishra as Pinto, Yadav's goon 1.
Vrajesh Hirjee as Albert, Yadav's goon 2.
Usha Nadkarni as Kanta Narayan, Laxmi Narayan 1's mother.
Manoj Pahwa as Batlya Bhai
Arjun Punj as Sonu Narayan, Laxmi Narayan 3's son.
Ashwin Mushran as D.M. Pipat, Laxmi Narayan 2's boss.
Rohitash Gaud as Recovery Agent, (cameo)
Jitu Shivhare as Chhota Khujl

Characters
 Laxmi Narayan 1 (Tusshar Kapoor): He needs to prove his killer instincts. However, he always fails. It's his last chance to kill, but he ends up becoming the victim — of love!
 Laxmi Narayan 2 (Sunil Shetty): He's a loveable geek who has an MBA and takes pride in mastering detail. He'll do anything to please the boss, including bearding a Don in his den. But when beaten up, burnt and tortured, even this ever affable soul wants to quit.
 Laxmi Narayan 3 (Paresh Rawal): All the Bhabhis and Behenjis of Delhi will vouch for his uncanny eye. He comes across Laila who refuses to show him what he wants and blackmails him instead!
 Jiya (Esha Deol): Jiya is a talented lingerie designer who is desperate to strike a deal that will settle her debts with the lecherous Mende. Waiting for underwear expert Laxmi 3 she falls for Laxmi 1— the man who has come to kill her.
 Laila (Sameera Reddy): Laila will do anything to save her auto showroom from creditors. She will agree to strip or even try and sell off an old car till she discovers that the same car holds diamonds.
 Inspector Mayawati Chautala (Neetu Chandra): She's bright and alert and is attracted to Laxmi 2. She's on the lookout for criminals and diamond thieves, but finds herself chasing after all three Laxmis.
 Chandu & Chandni (Upen Patel & Tanisha): They work in the auto showroom and love in their spare time. They hide the diamonds in an ancient car they think nobody will ever buy.
 D'mello "Papa" Yadav (Mukesh Tiwari): He puts an S after every single word, including his goons Pinto and Alberts' names.
 Pinto (Sanjai Mishra): Nasal-voiced, he has a diploma in constructing bombs.
 Albert (Vrajesh Hirjee): He is the quieter goon. He always has a cigarette and rarely talks.
 Kanta Narayan (Usha Nadkarni): Laxmi 1's mother, who wants her son to become a murderer, and is willing disown him if he fails.
 Batlya Bhai (Manoj Pahwa): The man who originally wanted the diamonds.
 Murli Manohar Munde (Murali Sharma): His catchphrase is "Murli Manohar Munde. Na zyada na kam. Bubblegum?" (Murli Manohar Munde. Not more, not less. Bubblegum?)
 Sonu Narayan (Arjun Punj): The son of Laxmi 3.
 D. M. Pipat (Ashwin Mushran): He is fed up with Laxmi 2's detailed information.

Box office
The film had an unsuccessful run at the box office, grossing 23.75 crore (including entertainment tax).

Soundtrack

References

External links
 

2008 films
Indian remakes of American films
2000s Hindi-language films
Indian crime comedy films
2000s crime comedy films
Films about criminals
2000s masala films
2008 comedy films
Films scored by Raghav Sachar